LRP4 can refer to:
 CORIN
 low density lipoprotein receptor-related protein 4